Gillen D'Arcy Wood is Professor of Environmental Humanities and English at the University of Illinois at Urbana-Champaign. He is originally from Australia, the son of H. D'Arcy Wood and a grandson of A. Harold Wood. He studied at Monash University in Melbourne and received his Ph.D from Columbia University in New York City under a Fulbright scholarship and has published extensively on nineteenth-century environmental history, art and literature.

He is the author of The Shock of the Real: Romanticism and Visual Culture, 1760-1860 (Palgrave, 2001), Romanticism and Music Culture in Britain, 1770-1840: Virtue and Virtuosity (Cambridge UP, 2010), an historical novel, Hosack's Folly (Other Press, 2005), the award-winning Tambora: The Eruption That Changed the World (Princeton, NJ: Princeton University Press, 2014),  and recently, Land of Wondrous Cold: The Race to Discover Antarctica and Unlock the Secrets of Its Ice (Princeton, NJ: Princeton University Press, 2020).

References

External links
Gillen Wood page at University of Illinois at Urbana-Champaign

Year of birth missing (living people)
Living people
American academics of English literature
University of Illinois Urbana-Champaign faculty
Columbia University alumni
Australian emigrants to the United States